Wings & Rings is a Cincinnati-based sports restaurant franchise. It offers a menu of Buffalo wings, burgers, salads, and sandwiches.

History
Founded in Cincinnati in 1984, Wings & Rings was purchased in 2005 by a management team led by Philip Schram, Nader Masadeh, and Haytham David, each of whom took a senior management role with the company.

In 2008, Restaurant Business magazine named the company number one on its Future 50 list of growing chains.

The company has 80 units in the US, the Middle East, and Europe.

Company leadership

Nader Masadeh has served as the Chief Executive Officer since 2014, while Philip Schram serves as Chief Development Officer, and Haytham David as the Chief Executive Officer of International.

Masadeh was featured in the 7th-season premiere of Undercover Boss, which aired Sunday, December 20, 2015 on CBS. For a couple of weeks, CEO Masadeh worked undercover alongside employees, doing everything from washing dishes in a Cincinnati location, to serving tables in Chicago and prepping meals in Bardstown, Kentucky.

Awards and recognition
Franchise Business Review's Top 40 Food and Beverage Franchises 2016
"Best of Fest" award at the 16th annual Chicago Wingfest in 2015
Number 1 Restaurant Chain for 2008 on the Restaurant Business "Future 50 List"
"Data Devotee" Award - Fishbowl User Conference
Ranked in 2018 by Entrepreneur Magazine as #12 in the full-service restaurant category.

References

External links
 

Restaurant franchises
Restaurant chains in the United States
Companies based in Cincinnati
Restaurants established in 1984
Cuisine of Cincinnati
1984 establishments in Ohio
Chicken chains of the United States